Catocala ariana is a moth in the family Erebidae first described by Eva Vartian in 1964. It is found in Afghanistan.

References

ariana
Moths described in 1964
Moths of Asia